Steeple is a hamlet and former civil parish, now in the civil parish of Steeple with Tyneham, in the Purbeck district of the English county of Dorset. In 2013 the estimated population of the civil parish was 60. The civil parish was abolished on 1 April 2014 and merged with Tyneham to form Steeple with Tyneham.

The  Gerrard  family  of Longhide were the principal  landowners here fromb the   fourteenth  to the sixteenth century; the  lands then passed by inheritance to the Napier family.

The ancient Norman church of Steeple, dedicated to St Michael and All Angels, lacks a steeple. It has a coat of arms engraved in stone in the porch and another painted in scarlet of the roof interior that is precisely the same as George Washington's coat of arms, showing stars and stripes.

The Washington arms is quartered with those of the squires of Steeple village, the Lawrence family, who are allied with the Washingtons by the marriage of one of its sons, Edmund Lawrence, to Agnes de Wessington in 1390.

The flag of the US capital hangs inside the church, presented on 25 July 1977 by Walter E Washington, Mayor of Washington DC from 2 January 1975 - 2 January 1979

On the highest local point of the nearby Purbeck Ridge is an 18th-century folly built by the former owner of Creech Grange and known as Grange Arch. Today it is a Grade II listed building owned by the National Trust.

References

 Dorset Pioneers: Jack Dwyer: The History Press: 2009:

External links

Villages in Dorset
Former civil parishes in Dorset
Isle of Purbeck
Populated places disestablished in 2014